Diptera of Patagonia and South Chile is a series of books produced by the British Museum (Natural History) (now called the Natural History Museum). The books detail the Diptera collected primarily by the museum's expeditions to Patagonia in 1926, sometimes with notes of some later collections and material held in other collections.

Full list of volumes

Vol : 1 - Crane flies

Vol : 2 - Other Nematocera

Vol : 3 - Mycetophilidae

Vol : 4 - Empididae

Vol : 5 - Larger Brachycera

Vol : 6 - Aschiza

Vol : 7 - Calyptrates

References

.Patagonia
Entomological literature
D
D
D
Natural History Museum, London